Candara or Kandara was a town of ancient Paphlagonia, inhabited from Achaemenid through Roman times. Stephanus of Byzantium writes that it was "in Paphlagonia, three schoeni from Gangra, and a village Thariba" and that a temple of Hera Candarene was there.

Its site is tentatively located near Candere, Asiatic Turkey.

References

Populated places in ancient Paphlagonia
Former populated places in Turkey
Roman towns and cities in Turkey
History of Çankırı Province